Racism in the United Kingdom refers to negative attitudes and views on race or ethnicity within the viewpoints of groups or individuals or existing systemically in the United Kingdom. The extent and the targets of racist attitudes in the United Kingdom have varied over time. It has resulted in cases of discrimination, riots and racially motivated murders. Racism was uncommon in the attitudes and norms of the British class system during the 19th century, in which race mattered less than social distinction: an African tribal chief was unquestionably superior to an English costermonger. Use of the word "racism" became more widespread after 1936, although the term "race hatred" was used in the late 1920s by sociologist Frederick Hertz. Laws were passed in the 1960s that specifically prohibited racial segregation.

Racism has been observed as having a correlation between factors such as levels of unemployment, immigration and population replacement in an area. Some studies suggest Brexit led to a rise in racist incidents, where locals became hostile to foreigners or immigrants. Poles, Romanians and other European groups have been adversely affected in recent decades. 

Studies published in 2014 and 2015 claimed racism was on the rise in the UK, with more than one third of those polled perceiving they were racially prejudiced. However a 2019 EU survey, the prevalence of perceived racist harassment toward people of African descent in the UK was the second lowest among the 12 Western European countries surveyed.

Sectarianism between British Protestants and Irish Catholics in Northern Ireland has been called a form of racism by some international bodies. It has resulted in widespread discrimination, segregation and serious violence, especially during partition and the Troubles.

Slave trade 

Within British society were slave owners. By the mid 18th century, London had the largest Black population in Britain, made up of free and enslaved people, as well as many runaways. The total number may have been about 10,000.  Some of these people were forced into beggary due to the lack of jobs and racial discrimination. Owners of African slaves in England would advertise slave-sales and for re-capture runaways.

After abolition 
Racism against black people grew after 1860, when race-based discrimination was fed by then-popular theories of scientific racism. Attempts to support these theories cited 'scientific evidence', such as brain size. James Hunt, President of the London Anthropological Society, in 1863 in his paper "On the Negro's place in nature" wrote,"the Negro is inferior intellectually to the European...[and] can only be humanised and civilised by Europeans.''

Following disarmament in 1919, surplus of labour and shortage of housing led to dissatisfaction among Britain’s working class, in particular sailors and dock workers. In ports, such as South Shields, Glasgow, London's East End, Liverpool, Cardiff, Barry and Newport there were fierce race riots targeting ethnic minority populations. During violence in 1919 there were five fatalities, as well as widespread vandalism of property. 120 black workers were sacked in Liverpool after whites refused to work with them. A modern study of the 1919 riots by Jacqueline Jenkinson showed that police arrested nearly twice as many blacks (155) as whites (89). While most of the whites were convicted, nearly half of Black arrestees were acquitted. Jenkinson suggests that the courts acknowledged their innocence and were recognising and attempting to correct for police bias.

The colour bar existed throughout much of the country in the early 20th century. The landmark case Constantine v Imperial Hotels Ltd (1944) established an important step in the development of modern anti-discrimination law and according to Peter Mason, it "was one of the key milestones along the road to the creation of the Race Relations Act of 1965." Popular Trinidadian cricketer Learie Constantine was awarded damages at the High Court after being turned away from the Imperial Hotel in Russell Square, London in 1943. The proprietor believed his presence would offend white American servicemen staying at the hotel, as the United States Armed Forces were still racially segregated. Public and political opinion was in Constantine's favour over the case. In Parliament, then Under-Secretary of State for Dominion Affairs Paul Emrys-Evans said the government: "most strongly condemns any form of racial discrimination against Colonial people in this country." Although racial discrimination continued in England, this case was the first to challenge such practices in court. Critics regard it as a milestone in British racial equality in demonstrating that black people had legal recourse against some forms of racism.

There were further riots targeting immigrant and minority populations in East London and Notting Hill in the 1950s, leading to the establishment of the Notting Hill Carnival.

Windrush generation 

Black immigrants who arrived in Britain from the Caribbean in the 1950s faced racism. For many Caribbean immigrants, their first experience of discrimination came when trying to find private accommodation. They were generally ineligible for council housing because only people who had been resident in the UK for a minimum of five years qualified for it. At the time, there was no anti-discrimination legislation to prevent landlords from refusing to accept black tenants. A survey undertaken in Birmingham in 1956 found that only 15 of a total of 1,000 white people surveyed would let a room to a black tenant. As a result, many black immigrants were forced to live in slum areas of cities, where the housing was of poor quality and there were problems of crime, violence and prostitution. One of the most notorious slum landlords was Peter Rachman, who owned around 100 properties in the Notting Hill area of London. Black tenants sometimes paid twice the rent of white tenants, and lived in conditions of extreme overcrowding.

Historian Winston James argues that the experience of racism in Britain was a major factor in the development of a shared Caribbean identity amongst black immigrants from a range of different island and class backgrounds.

1970s and 1980s 

In the 1970s and 1980s, black people in Britain were the victims of racist violence perpetrated by far-right groups such as the National Front. During this period, it was also common for black footballers to be subjected to racist chanting from crowd members.

In the early 1980s, societal racism, discrimination and poverty—alongside further perceptions of powerlessness and oppressive policing—sparked a series of riots in areas with substantial African-Caribbean populations. These riots took place in St Pauls in 1980, Brixton, Toxteth and Moss Side in 1981, St Pauls again in 1982, Notting Hill Gate in 1982, Toxteth in 1982, and Handsworth, Brixton and Tottenham in 1985.

South Asians
Racism against British Asians is committed not only by long-established white Britons, but also by other immigrant races that came to the UK. South Asians have also carried out racially motivated murders and attempted murders of English and other White British people in their homeland.

Xenophobia in modern Britain is also tied to Islamophobia and Hinduphobia, and the growing hate crimes against those within these minority groups. This is fuelled by groups such as the English Defence League (EDL) that target ethnic minorities from countries where Islam is the major religion. This is directly related to the racist notions that have been perpetuated throughout British history. The current hate against these groups can be shown to reflect the attitudes in the sixties by politicians such as Enoch Powell and are still prevalent today in debate and discussion.

British India
Various British historians like James Mills and Charles Grant wrote influentials books and essays portraying Indians as deceitful, liars, dishonest, depraved and incapable of ruling themselves.

The relationship between "Indomania" and "Indophobia" in colonial era British Indology was discussed by American Indologist Thomas Trautmann (1997) who found that Indomania had become a norm in early 19th century Britain as the result of a conscious agenda of Evangelicalism and utilitarianism, especially by Charles Grant and James Mill. Historians noted that during the British Empire, "evangelical influence drove British policy down a path that tended to minimize and denigrate the accomplishments of Indian civilization and to position itself as the negation of the earlier British Indomania that was nourished by belief in Indian wisdom."

In Grant's highly influential "Observations on the ...Asiatic subjects of Great Britain" (1796), he criticized the Orientalists for being too respectful to Indian culture and religion. His work tried to determine the Hindus' "true place in the moral scale" and he alleged that the Hindus are "a people exceedingly depraved". Grant believed that Great Britain's duty was to civilise and Christianize the natives.

Lord Macaulay, serving on the Supreme Council of India between 1834 and 1838, was instrumental in creating the foundations of bilingual colonial India. He convinced the Governor-General to adopt English as the medium of instruction in higher education from the sixth year of schooling onwards, rather than Sanskrit or Arabic. He claimed: "I have never found one among them who could deny that a single shelf of a good European library was worth the whole native literature of India and Arabia." He wrote that Arabic and Sanskrit works on medicine contain "medical doctrines which would disgrace an English Farrier – Astronomy, which would move laughter in girls at an English boarding school – History, abounding with kings thirty feet high reigns thirty thousand years long – and Geography made up of seas of treacle and seas of butter".

One of the most influential historians of India during the British Empire, James Mill was criticised for prejudice against Hindus. Horace Hayman Wilson wrote that the tendency of Mill's work was "evil". Mill claimed that both Indians and Chinese people are cowardly, unfeeling and mendacious. Both Mill and Grant attacked Orientalist scholarship that was too respectful of Indian culture: "It was unfortunate that a mind so pure, so warm in the pursuit of truth so devoted to oriental learning, as that of Sir William Jones, should have adopted the hypothesis of a high state of civilization in the principal countries of Asia."

Paki-bashing (1960s1990s)

Starting in the late 1960s, and peaking in the 1970s and 1980s, violent gangs opposed to immigration took part in frequent attacks known as "Paki-bashing", which targeted and assaulted Pakistanis and other South Asians. "Paki-bashing" was unleashed after Enoch Powell's inflammatory Rivers of Blood speech in 1968, although there is "little agreement on the extent to which Powell was responsible for racial attacks". Powell refused to accept responsibility for any violence, or to disassociate himself from the views when questioned by David Frost in 1969, arguing that they were never associated in the first place.

These attacks peaked during the 1970s1980s, with the attacks mainly linked to far-right fascist, racist and anti-immigrant movements, including the white power skinheads, the National Front, and the British National Party (BNP). These attacks were usually referred to as either "Paki-bashing" or "skinhead terror", with the attackers usually called "Paki-bashers" or "skinheads". "Paki-bashing" was suggested to have been fueled by perceived anti-immigrant and anti-Pakistani rhetoric from the British media at the time. It is also suggested that this was fueled by perceived systemic failures of state authorities, which is alleged to include under-reporting racist attacks, beliefs amongst some communities that the criminal justice system was not taking racist attacks seriously, perceived racial harassment by police, and allegations of police involvement in racist violence.

Mahesh Upadhyaya 
In 1968, Mahesh Upadhyaya was the first person in the UK to bring up a case of racial discrimination under the Race Relations Act. He was an Indian shift engineer looking for houses. Upon seeing an advertisement for a house in Huddersfield, he was informed by the CEO of the company that they did not "sell to coloured people". Upadhyaya complained to the Race Relations Board the same day (13 December 1968), and they filed a civil action against the company in June 1969, the first of its kind in the country. In September, the judge in the case ruled that the company had engaged in unlawful discrimination under the Race Relations Act, but failed the case on a technicality.

Jews

Since the arrival of Jews in England following the Norman Conquest in 1066 Jews have been subjected to discrimination. Jews living in England from about the reign of King Stephen experienced religious discrimination and it is thought that the blood libel which accused Jews of ritual murder originated in England, leading to massacres and increasing discrimination. An example of early English antisemitism was the York pogrom at Clifford's Tower in 1190 which resulted in an estimated 150 Jews taking their own lives or being burned to death in the tower. The earliest recorded images of anti-semitism are found in the Royal tax records from 1233. The Jewish presence in England continued until King Edward I's Edict of Expulsion in 1290.

In the late 19th and early 20th century, the number of Jews in Britain greatly increased due to the exodus of Jews from Russia, which resulted in a large community of Jews forming in the East End of London. Popular sentiment against immigration was used by the British Union of Fascists to incite hatred against Jews, leading to the Battle of Cable Street in 1936, at which the fascists were repulsed by Jews, Irish dock workers and communists and anti-fascists who barricaded the streets.

In the 20th century, the UK began restricting immigration under the Aliens Act 1905. Although the Act did not mention Jews specifically, "it was clear to most observers" that the act was mainly aimed at Jews fleeing persecution in Eastern Europe. Winston Churchill, then a Liberal MP, said that the Act appealed to "insular prejudice against the foreigners, to racial prejudice against the Jews, and to labour prejudice against competition".

In the aftermath of the Holocaust, undisguised, racial hatred of Jews became unacceptable in British society. However, outbursts of antisemitism emanating from far right groups continued, leading to opposition by the 43 Group, formed by Jewish ex-servicemen, which broke up fascist meetings. Far-right antisemitism was motivated principally by racial hatred, rather than Christian theological accusations of deicide.

Following an escalation in the Palestinian-Israel crisis in 2021, the number of antisemitic incidents in London increased by 500%. London Rabbis reported a general sense of fear in the community, and four people were arrested for racially aggravated public order offenses whilst brandishing Palestinian flags.

Chinese
Michael Wilkes from the British Chinese Project said that racism against them is not taken as seriously as racism against African, African-Caribbean or South Asian people, and that a lot of racist attacks towards the British Chinese community go unreported, primarily because of widespread mistrust in the police.

Chinese labourers

From the middle of the 19th century, Chinese were seen as a source for cheap labourers for the building of the British Empire. However, this resulted in animosity against Chinese labourers as competing for British jobs. Hostilities were seen when Chinese were being recruited for work in the British Transvaal Colony (present day South Africa), resulted in 28 riots between July 1904 to July 1905, and later becoming a key debating point as part of the 1906 United Kingdom general election. This would also be the source of the 1911 seamen's strike in Cardiff, which resulted in rioting and the destruction of about 30 Chinese laundries.

While Chinese were recruited to support British war efforts, after the end of the Second World War, the British Government sought to forcibly repatriate thousands of seamen in a Home Office policy HO 213/926 to "Compulsory repatriation of undesirable Chinese seamen." Many of the seamen left behind wives and mixed-race children that they would never see again. A network has also been established for families of Chinese seamen who were repatriated after the Second World War.

2001 foot-and-mouth outbreak
Government reports in early 2001 highlighted the smuggling of illegal meat as a possible source for the 2001 United Kingdom foot-and-mouth outbreak, some of which was destined for a Chinese restaurant. This reportedly resulted in a drop in 40% of trade for Chinese catering businesses throughout some 12,000 Chinese takeaways and 3,000 Chinese restaurants in the United Kingdom, which made up about 80% of the British Chinese workforce at the time. Community leaders saw this as racist and xenophobic, with a scapegoating of the British Chinese community for the spread of the disease.

COVID-19 pandemic

On 12 February 2020, Sky News reported that some British Chinese said they were facing increasing levels of racist abuse during the COVID-19 pandemic. It was recorded that hate crimes against British Chinese people between January and March 2020 have tripled the amount of hate crimes in the past two years in the UK. According to the London Metropolitan Police, between January and June 2020, 457 race-related crimes had occurred against British East and Southeast Asians.

Verbal abuse has been one of the common forms of racism experienced by British Chinese. Just before the lockdown in February 2020, British Chinese children recalled experiences of fear and frustration due to bullying and name calling in their schools. According to a June 2020 poll, 76% of British Chinese had received racial slurs at least once, and 50% regularly received racial slurs, a significantly higher frequency than experienced by any other racial minority.

Racism during the pandemic has also impacted a number of Chinese-owned business, especially within the catering business, as well as an increase in violent assaults against British East and Southeast Asians.

White British
Asian on White

Richard Norman Everitt was a White English fifteen-year-old boy who was stabbed to death by a gang of Bangladeshi men who patrolled the streets looking for whites to kill in London in 1994. The gang had stabbed a white sixteen-year-old boy before murdering Richard.

Ross Parker was a White British seventeen-year-old boy who was stabbed, beaten with a hammer and kicked to death by a gang of Pakistani men in Peterborough who in 2001 had planned to find "a white male to attack simply because he was white".

Kriss Donald was a White Scottish fifteen-year-old boy who was kidnapped, stabbed and set on fire, by three Pakistani men in Glasgow in 2004 "for being white".

Institutional Racism

Cheshire Police force were found to have rejected a "well prepared" potential recruit who applied in 2017 because he is a white, heterosexual male. The force was subsequently found guilty of discrimination.

Regarding the anti-white discrimination in the Royal Air Force, chairman of the defence select committee Tobias Ellwood told MPs that the armed force's ex head of recruitment had pointed out that 160 white men had been discriminated against before resigning in protest. Mr Ellwood told MPs that the RAF's prioritisation of ethnic minority and female pilots in a bid to improve diversity could have a significant impact "on the RAF's operational performance".

Mass Child Rape

Quilliam International found that "84% of ‘grooming gang’ offenders were (South) Asian, while they only make up 7% of total UK population ... Most of these men are of Pakistani (Muslim) origin, and the majority of their victims are young, white girls. The report suggests that the background of these men has influenced their actions." This included use of anti-white racist abuse during violent rapes. Dr Ella Hill, herself a survivor and subject to anti-white abuse during racially aggravated violent gang rapes, estimates that there were up to 500,000 victims over the forty years prior to 2020.

In December 2017, Quilliam released a report entitled "Group Based Child Sexual Exploitation – Dissecting Grooming Gangs", concluding that 84% of offenders were of South Asian heritage. This report was fiercely criticised for its poor methodology by Ella Cockbain and Waqas Tufail, in their paper "Failing victims, fuelling hate: challenging the harms of the 'Muslim grooming gangs' narrative" which was published in January 2020. In December that year, a further report by the Home Office was released, showing that the majority of CSE gangs were, in fact, composed of white men.

Research has found that group-based child sexual exploitation offenders are most commonly white. Some studies suggest an overrepresentation of black and Asian offenders relative to the demographics of national populations. However, it is not possible to conclude that this is representative of all group-based CSE offending.

Writing in The Guardian, Cockbain and Tufail wrote of the report that "The two-year study by the Home Office makes very clear that there are no grounds for asserting that Muslim or Pakistani-heritage men are disproportionately engaged in such crimes, and, citing our research, it confirmed the unreliability of the Quilliam claim".

Irish

Eastern Europeans and other European minorities 
In the 21st century, following the significant influx of Central,
Southern and Eastern European migrants and the economic downturn in 2008, racist and xenophobic attitudes and effects are reported to have risen in Great Britain. There has been a particular sharp increase in xenophobia against Central ,Southern and Eastern European immigrants.

Brexit 
Since Brexit, there has been a rapid increase in xenophobia towards Eastern Europeans, specifically Poles, Romanians & Bulgarians. After the referendum of the UK leaving the EU, many Poles reported that they had got verbally abused in public. Many Romanians, living in the northern England had also reported racist abuse in public; many Romanians were also worried about how they were getting stereotyped as "Gypsies". Many people of Eastern European background and other European minorities such as Italians and Greeks have  also have said they don't feel welcome in the country due to the xenophobia. There was also a lot of cases of people in minority groups of European descent reporting the racist abuse to Police and the police not doing anything about it.

Romani/Gypsies 
Racism against Roma and Irish Travellers is prevalent in the United Kingdom.

Between minority groups 

Both the Bradford riots and the Oldham Riots occurred in 2001, following cases of racism.  These were either the public displays of racist sentiment or, as in the Brixton Riots, racial profiling and alleged harassment by police forces. In 2005, there were the Birmingham riots, derived from ethnic tensions between the British African-Caribbean people and British Asian communities, with the spark for the riot being an unsubstantiated gang rape of a teenage black girl by a group of South Asian men.

Class based 
The issue of class and its link with racism has become renewed in recent years with Brexit and the rising popularity of far-right groups. A report suggested that the pre-supposed 'whitening' of the working class has been taken in vain and that the more important issue is that of class exclusion that has resulted in racism against minority groups. This report in particular suggests class racism in this respect is not as a result of the typical suggested theory of a 'dislike of foreigners' but as an unease of their immediate societal change. It is described as 'working class re-imagined through Thatcherism. Aspirant, atomised and defensively mono-cultural'. Other arguments indicate that poor education is a reason for class based racism, here the attention is based largely on white males who have been left behind by globalisation one could argue. Racism can happen both between classes and within classes. Within a class, it could be as a result of competition for social mobility. Between classes, it has been seen household incomes between £25,000 and £50,000 are actually more likely than the working class to be prejudiced against minorities.

Constituent nations

Scotland
In 2006, 1,543 victims of racist crime in Scotland were of Pakistani origin, while more than 1,000 victims were classed as being "White British".

As of 11 February 2011, attacks on ethnic minorities in Scotland had contributed to a 20% increase in racist incidents over the past twelve months. Reports say every day in Scotland, seventeen people are abused, threatened or violently attacked because of the colour of their skin, ethnicity or nationality. Statistics showed that just under 5,000 incidents of racism were recorded in 2009/10, a slight decrease from racist incidents recorded in 2008/9.

From 2004 to 2012, the rate of racist incidents has been around 5,000 incidents per year.  In 2011–12, there were 5,389 racist incidents recorded by the police, which is a 10% increase on the 4,911 racist incidents recorded in 2010–11.

White on Asian
In 2009, the murder of an Indian sailor named Kunal Mohanty by a White-Scotsman named Christopher Miller resulted in Miller's conviction as a criminal motivated by racial hatred. Miller's brother gave evidence during the trial and said Miller told him he had "done a Paki".

Northern Ireland 
Northern Ireland had in 2004 the highest number of racist incidents per person in the UK, and has been branded the "race-hate capital of Europe". Foreigners are three times more likely to suffer a racist incident in Northern Ireland than elsewhere in the UK.

According to police, most racist incidents happen in loyalist Protestant areas, and members of loyalist paramilitary groups have orchestrated a series of racist attacks aimed at "ethnically cleansing" these areas. There have been pipe bomb, petrol bomb and gun attacks on the homes of immigrants and people of different ethnic origins. Masked gangs have also ransacked immigrants' homes and assaulted the residents. In 2009, more than 100 Roma were forced to flee their homes in Belfast following sustained attacks by a racist mob, who allegedly threatened to kill them. That year, a Polish immigrant was beaten to death in an apparently racist attack in Newry. Police recorded more than 1,100 racist incidents in 2013/14, but they believe most incidents are not reported to them.

Wales
An anti-Irish race riot took place in 1848 in the largely Irish immigrant Cardiff suburb of Newtown.

At the time of the First World War, Cardiff's docks area had the largest black and Asian population outside of London. In June 1919 riots took place in Newport, Cardiff and Barry with non-whites being attacked and their property destroyed. The events were not acknowledged or recorded until the 1980s.

Institutional

Police

Various police forces in the United Kingdom (such as the Greater Manchester Police, the London Metropolitan Police, the Sussex Police and the West Yorkshire Police services) have been accused of institutionalised racism throughout the late 20th and 21st centuries, by people such as the Chief Constable of the GMP in 1998 (David Wilmot); the BBC's Secret Policeman documentary 5 years later (which led to the resignation of 6 officers); Metropolitan Police Commissioner Bernard Hogan-Howe.

The National Black Police Association which allows only African, African-Caribbean and Asian officers as full members has been criticised as a racist organization by some because of its selective membership criteria based on ethnic origin.

However, when looking at 10 years of data up to 2018 of deaths in custody by race compared to number of arrests made, a white individual who had been arrested was about 25% more likely to die in custody than a black individual who had been arrested. Nevertheless, the same IOPC report also found that of the 164 people that have died in or following police custody in England and Wales, 13 were black, a number that is overall disproportionate to the ~3% of the English and Welsh population that identified as black in the 2011 census. When allowing for these numbers, black people are more than twice as likely to die in police custody.

The Lammy Review outlined treatment of Black, Asian and Minority Ethnic individuals in the policing and criminal justice system and found significant racial bias in the UK justice system.

Prison 
Prison guards are almost twice as likely to be reported for racism than inmates in the UK, with racist incidents between prison guards themselves being nearly as high as that between guards and prisoners. The environment has been described as a dangerous breeding ground for racist extremism.

Criminal justice system 
It has been shown that lower rates of guilty pleas has led to black and Asian teenage boys and young men to be sent to prison at higher rates than white counterparts, and therefore more likely to get long sentences for homicide and other crimes. However, the study does not account for previous convictions. David Lammy stated, "Clearly when someone commits a crime, they need to be punished. However, we cannot have one rule for one group of people and a different rule for another group of people. As I found in my 2017 review of the criminal justice system, some of the difference in sentencing is the result of a 'trust deficit'. Many BAME defendants simply still do not believe that the justice system will deliver less punitive treatment if they plead guilty. It's vital that all parts of the criminal justice system work hard to address these discrepancies, so that the same crime leads to the same sentence, regardless of ethnicity."

Healthcare
An area where racism is pervasive is in healthcare and health-related systems and infrastructure. There is overwhelming evidence of racism in the National Health Service, Medical and Nursing Professional Regulators, and the Healthcare and social care industry. Although the evidence is vast, there is a constant attempt to cover up, suppress, and deny these. Admission of racism in this sector is rare, usually unwholesome, and usually inadequate to effect changes other than superficial and cosmetic 'system changes'. People classified as Black and Ethnic minorities are the most severely impacted, consequently, they are the most likely to suffer consequences that criminalize, demote, under-employ, under-promote, harshly, or severely inflict consequences on individuals, families, and communities.

21st century
Racism in Britain in general, including against black people, is considered to have declined over time. Robert Ford, professor of politics at Manchester, demonstrates that social distance, measured using questions from the British Social Attitudes survey about whether people would mind having an ethnic minority boss or have a close relative marry an ethnic minority spouse, declined over the period 1983–1996. These declines were observed for attitudes towards both Black and Asian ethnic minorities. Much of this change in attitudes happened in the 1990s. In the 1980s, opposition to interracial marriage was significant.

Nonetheless, Ford argues that "Racism and racial discrimination remain a part of everyday life for Britain's ethnic minorities. Black and Asian Britons...are less likely to be employed and are more likely to work in worse jobs, live in worse houses and suffer worse health than White Britons". The University of Maryland's Minorities at Risk (MAR) project noted in 2006 that while African-Caribbeans in the United Kingdom no longer face formal discrimination, they continue to be under-represented in politics, and to face discriminatory barriers in access to housing and in employment practices. The project also notes that the British school system "has been indicted on numerous occasions for racism, and for undermining the self-confidence of black children and maligning the culture of their parents". The MAR profile notes "growing 'black on black' violence between people from the Caribbean and immigrants from Africa".

A report published by the University and College Union in 2019 found that just 0.1% of active professors in the UK are black women, compared with 68% who are white men, and found that the black women professors had faced discriminatory abuse and exclusion throughout their careers.

The United Kingdom has been accused of "sleepwalking into segregation" by Trevor Phillips, chair of the Commission for Racial Equality.

However a 2019 EU survey, 'Being black in the EU', ranked the UK as the least racist in the 12 Western European countries surveyed.

In June 2020, there were protests throughout the UK, as there were in many countries around the world, following the murder of George Floyd by police in the United States. These protests were accompanied by actions against memorials to people thought to be involved with the slave trade or other historic racism, including protests, petitions, and vandalism of the memorials.

As a result of these protests the UK Government held a Commission on Race and Ethnic disparities between the 26th of October and the 30th of November 2020. On the 26th of November 2020 the chair of the commission sent a letter to Kemi Badenoch the Minister for Equalities to give the Government an update on the commission’s progress and to furthermore ask for an extension to the deadline of completion.

Official interventions
The Race Relations Act 1965 outlawed public discrimination, and established the Race Relations Board. Further Acts in 1968 and 1976 outlawed discrimination in employment, housing and social services, and replaced the Race Relations Board with Commission for Racial Equality that merged into the Equality and Human Rights Commission in 2004. The Human Rights Act 1998 made organisations in the UK, including public authorities, subject to the European Convention on Human Rights. The Race Relations Amendment Act 2000 extends existing legislation for the public sector to the police force, and requires public authorities to promote equality.

Polls in the 1960s and 1970s showed that racial prejudice was widespread among the British population at the time. A Gallup poll, for example, showed that 75% of the population were sympathetic to Enoch Powell's views expressed in his Rivers of Blood speech. An NOP poll showed that approximately 75% of the British population agreed with Powell's demand for non-white immigration to be halted completely, and about 60% agreed with his inflammatory call for the repatriation of non-whites already resident in Britain.

A 1981 report identified both "racial discrimination" and an "extreme racial disadvantage" in the UK, concluding that urgent action was needed to prevent these issues becoming an "endemic, ineradicable disease threatening the very survival of our society". The era saw an increase in attacks on black and Asian people by white people. The Joint Campaign Against Racism committee reported that there had been more than 20,000 attacks on British people of colour, including Britons of South Asian origin, during 1985.

See also

 Antisemitism in the United Kingdom
Antisemitism in the UK Conservative Party
Antisemitism in the UK Labour Party
 Anti-German sentiment
 Almondbury Community School bullying incident
 British nationalism
British Israelism
English nationalism
 Environmental racism in the United Kingdom
 Euroscepticism in the United Kingdom 
 Institutional racism in the United Kingdom
 Islamophobia in the United Kingdom
 Islamophobia in the UK Conservative Party (2016–present)
 Murder of Kriss Donald
 Murder of Ross Parker
 Murder of Stephen Lawrence
 Pavlo Lapshyn
 Geography of antisemitism
 Antisemitism in Europe
 Racism by country
 Racism in Europe
 Racism in the UK Conservative Party
 Anti-Romani sentiment

References

Sources

 Olusoga, David. Black and British: A Forgotten History (Macmillan, 2016);

External links

 'No blacks, no dogs, no Gypsies', The Independent, 6 July 2008
 'Racism on the Rise in Britain', The Guardian, 27 May 2014

 
United Kingdom